EHIS may be:

 The European Health Insurance Card (successor to the E111 form).
 Emlyn Hughes International Soccer.